Evelyn Lakshmi Sharma is a German actress and model who appears primarily in Indian films of the Hindi language. She marked her film debut with the 2006 American film Turn Left and made her Bollywood debut in the 2012 film From Sydney with Love. She gained prominence following her appearance in the 2013 film Yeh Jawaani Hai Deewani.

Early life and background
Evelyn Lakshmi Sharma was born and raised in Frankfurt, Hesse, West Germany to an Indian Punjabi Hindu father and a German mother. She holds German citizenship.

In October 2019, Sharma got engaged to an Indo-Australian dental surgeon and entrepreneur, Tushaan Bhindi. On 15 May 2021, she married Bhindi in Brisbane, Australia. Their first child, a daughter, was born that November.

Career
Sharma began her acting career with a bit part in the 2006 American film Turn Left. In 2012, she made her Bollywood debut playing Lubaina Snyder in the film From Sydney with Love. The following year, she was featured in the film Yeh Jawaani Hai Deewani, and her performance was praised in Nautanki Saala! and Issaq. In 2014, she played the role of Janet D'souza in the sleeper hit Yaariyan.  In August 2014, Sharma released her first music single, "Something Beautiful", produced by Brooklyn Shanti. She has also hosted her own travel show titled Life Mein Ek Baar. In May 2015, she appeared in Devang Dholakia's Kuch Kuch Locha Hai opposite Navdeep Chabbra, Sunny Leone and Ram Kapoor and it was released on 8 May 2015. She was also featured in Ishqedarriyaan, which was released on 29 May 2015. She appeared in Saaho and Kissebaaz in the year 2019.

Filmography

References

External links

 
 
 

Living people
Year of birth missing (living people)
Actors from Frankfurt
German people of Punjabi descent
German people of Indian descent
German film actresses
German female models
Punjabi people
German Christians
German expatriates in India
Actresses of Indian descent
European actresses in India
Actresses of European descent in Indian films
Actresses in Hindi cinema
Actresses in Punjabi cinema
Actresses in Telugu cinema
21st-century German actresses